Tiger nut drink is a local drink made from tiger nuts, the drink is popular in the northern part of Nigeria as well as other parts of the world like Spain and India. It is also known as kunu aya.

Overview 
The major ingredients used in making the drink are tiger nut, dates and coconut. Cinnamon, coffee, vanilla essence, sugar and honey are also added to  give a unique taste and preserve the freshness  of the drink.

Chaff are removed from the blended tiger nut. The drink is served cold and must be consumed within 3 days if refrigerated.

See also 

 Hausa cuisine
 Zobo drink
 Plant milk

References 

African drinks
Nigerian drinks